Noteroclada is a small genus of liverworts of the Southern Hemisphere.  It is classified in order  Pelliales and is the only genus in the family  Noterocladaceae within that order.  Unlike Pellia, the other genus in the order, Noteroclada has a leafy appearance.

The species Noteroclada confluens is known primarily from the southern regions of South America, although it has been reported as far north as Costa Rica, and there is a report from New Zealand.  A possible second species is known from South Africa.

References

Pelliales
Liverwort genera